Patrick Joseph Brady (1868 – 20 May 1943) was Irish nationalist MP in the Parliament of the United Kingdom of Great Britain and Ireland for Dublin St Stephen's Green constituency from 1910 to 1918, during the closing years of the Irish Parliamentary Party’s dominance of Irish politics.  Later, he was a Senator of the Irish Free State from 1927 to 1928. He was one of the few parliamentarians who served in both the House of Commons and in the Oireachtas.

Eldest son of James Brady, he was born at Blackrock, Dublin and educated at St Vincent's College, Castleknock and at University College Dublin.  He was admitted a solicitor in 1893 and became senior partner, then head of the firm of Brady & Hayden.  He built up an extensive legal practice and became a member of the Council, and later President, of the Incorporated Law Society of Ireland.  He was also a director of the Hibernian Bank and of the Irish Great Southern Railways, and an active social welfare worker and member of the Catholic St Vincent de Paul Society.  In 1900 he married Evelyn Parminter, youngest daughter of John Douglas Parminter, a Paymaster in the Royal Navy.  She died in 1931.

P. J. Brady was a member of Blackrock Urban District Council and was subsequently elected as MP for Dublin St Stephen's Green at the general election of January 1910.  St Stephen's Green was not a safe seat for the Nationalists, being won by a Liberal, Liberal Unionist or Unionist in all five elections held between 1888 and 1898.  In January 1910 Brady defeated the Unionist candidate Henry O’Connor by 3,683 to 3,021.  At the second 1910 general election in December, he defeated a fresh Unionist candidate, Lord Reginald Herbert, by the bigger margin of 3,594 to 2,765.  In 1918, however, the seat went to the Sinn Féin candidate Thomas Kelly, who won 8,461 votes to Brady's 2,902 and the Unionist's 2,755.  Politically, Brady was described by Patrick Maume (1999) as a conservative who took a pro-employer stance in the 1913 Dublin strike led by James Larkin.

After the foundation of the Irish Free State in 1922, Brady served as a member of the advisory committee set up to frame the new courts system and Free State judiciary, resulting in the Courts of Justice Act 1924. On 26 January 1927 he was elected in a by-election to a vacancy in the Senate (Seanad Éireann), but was defeated at the regular election of December 1928.

Among those who attended his funeral at the Church of the Assumption, Booterstown, Dublin in May 1943 was his former revolutionary opponent Éamon de Valera, by that time Taoiseach.

References

Sources

Dod's Parliamentary Companion for 1912, London, Whittaker & Co.
Irish Independent, 21 and 24 May 1943
Patrick Maume, The Long Gestation:  Irish Nationalist Life 1891–1918, Dublin, Gill & MacMillan, 1999
Brian M. Walker (ed.), Parliamentary Election Results in Ireland, 1801–1922, Dublin, Royal Irish Academy, 1978
Who Was Who, 1941–1950

1868 births
1943 deaths
Politicians from County Dublin
Members of the Parliament of the United Kingdom for County Dublin constituencies (1801–1922)
Irish Parliamentary Party MPs
UK MPs 1910
UK MPs 1910–1918
Members of the 1925 Seanad
Independent members of Seanad Éireann
People from Blackrock, Dublin
Local councillors in County Dublin